Flagmount can refer to two places in Ireland:

 Flagmount, County Kilkenny, a village in County Kilkenny
 Flagmount, County Clare, a village in Killanena, County Clare